Gettysburg (non-locally ) is a borough and the county seat of Adams County in the U.S. state of Pennsylvania. The Battle of Gettysburg (1863) and President Abraham Lincoln's Gettysburg Address are named for this town. 

Gettysburg is home to the Gettysburg National Military Park, where the Battle of Gettysburg was largely fought; the Battle of Gettysburg had the most casualties of any Civil War battle but was also considered the turning point in the war, leading to the Union's ultimate victory.

As of the 2020 census, the borough had a population of 7,106 people.

History

Early history
In 1761, Irishman Samuel Gettys settled at the Shippensburg-Baltimore and Philadelphia-Pittsburgh crossroads, in what was then western York County, and established a tavern frequented by soldiers and traders. In 1786, the borough boundary was established, with the Dobbin House tavern (established in 1776) sitting in the southwest.

As early as 1790, a movement seeking to split off the western portion of York County into a separate county had begun. A commission was drawn up to fix the site of the new county's seat; they ultimately chose a location in Strabane Township (now Straban Township), just northeast of Gettysburg. In 1791, additional trustees were appointed to plan for the construction of public buildings in the town of Gettysburg instead of in Straban. On January 22, 1800, the Pennsylvania Legislature created Adams County, with Gettysburg as its county seat.

In 1858, the Gettysburg Railroad completed construction of a railroad line from Gettysburg to Hanover, and the Gettysburg Railroad Station opened a year later. Passenger train service to the town ended in 1942. The station was restored in 2006. In 2011, Senator Robert Casey introduced S. 1897, which would include the railroad station within the boundary of Gettysburg National Military Park. By 1860, the borough had grown in size to consist of "450 buildings [which] housed carriage manufacturing, shoemakers, and tanneries".

Civil War

Between July 1 and 3, 1863, the Battle of Gettysburg, one of the bloodiest battles during the American Civil War, was fought across the fields and heights in the vicinity of the town.

The Confederate Army of Northern Virginia, under the command of Robert E Lee, experienced success in the early stages of the battle but was ultimately defeated by the Army of the Potomac, commanded by George G. Meade. Lee executed an orderly withdrawal and escaped across the Potomac River without being drawn into another battle. Meade was heavily criticized by President Abraham Lincoln for his cautious pursuit and failure to destroy Lee's retreating army.

Casualties were high with total losses on both sides – over 27,000 Confederate and 23,000 Union. The residents of Gettysburg were left to care for the wounded and bury the dead following the Confederate retreat. Approximately 8,000 men and 3,000 horses lay under the summer sun. The soldiers' bodies were gradually reinterred in what is today known as Gettysburg National Cemetery, where, on November 19, 1863, Abraham Lincoln attended a ceremony to officially consecrate the grounds and delivered his Gettysburg Address.

A 20-year-old woman, Jennie Wade, was the only civilian killed during the battle. She was hit by a stray bullet that passed through her kitchen door while she was making bread on July 3.

Physical damage can still be seen in some of the houses throughout the town, notably the Schmucker House located on Seminary Ridge.

Furniture

The furniture manufacturing industry employed people in Gettysburg for the first half of the 20th century. The "Gettysburg Manufacturing Company", formed in 1902, was the first company established in the borough for the purpose of manufacturing residential furniture. Other companies soon followed. The borough's industry reached peak production and success about the 1920s. This important industry declined from 1951, when the three main companies either moved, closed or were sold. The Gettysburg Furniture Company factory closed in 1960, becoming a warehouse and distribution point for other furniture factories outside of Pennsylvania.

Tourism
Gettysburg manufacturing associated with tourism included a late 19th century foundry that manufactured gun carriages, bridgeworks and cannons for the Gettysburg Battlefield, as well as a construction industry for hotels, stables, and other buildings for tourist services. Early tourist buildings in the borough included museums (like the 1881 Danner Museum), souvenir shops, buildings of the electric trolley (preceded by a horse trolley from the Gettysburg Railroad Station to the Springs Hotel), and stands for hackmen who drove visitors in jitneys (horse-drawn group taxis) on tours. Modern tourist services in the borough include ghost tours, bed and breakfast lodging, and historical interpretation (reenactors, etc.).

Gettysburg is the site of the Eisenhower National Historic Site that preserves the home and farm of Dwight D. Eisenhower.

Geography
Rock Creek, a tributary of the Monocacy River and part of the Potomac River watershed, flows along its eastern edge.

Climate
Gettysburg lies in the transition zone between the humid continental climate of northern and central Pennsylvania to the north and the humid subtropical climate of central Maryland to the south, with hot, humid summers and cool winters. Winters range from cool to moderately cold, with relatively frequent snowfalls.

Pennsylvania's first on-farm methane digester was built near Gettysburg at the Mason-Dixon Farm in 1978, and generates 600KW.

Demographics

As of the 2010 census, Gettysburg had a population of 7,620, and was 79.6% non-Hispanic white, 10.9% Hispanic or Latino, 5.4% African American, 1.9% Asian, 2.2% all other.

Industry

The main industry of the borough is tourism associated with such historic sites as Gettysburg National Military Park (including the Gettysburg National Cemetery) and Eisenhower National Historic Site. Gettysburg has many activities and tours to offer to vacationers and tourists who are interested in the Gettysburg area and the history of the community and the battle.  Tourists for the annual reenactment of the Battle of Gettysburg use borough facilities, which include the Dobbin House Tavern and Hotel Gettysburg.

Battle of Gettysburg reenactment
Every year from July 1–3 volunteers reenact the Battle of Gettysburg. Each day re-enactors display a different part of the battle with commentary regarding the hardships of the battles. The battles are narrated by the battlefield guides of the Gettysburg National Military Park.

Transportation
Today the borough is a  hour drive from Philadelphia and a  hour drive from Pittsburgh via the Pennsylvania Turnpike and U.S. Route 15.

The main east–west road through downtown Gettysburg is U.S. Route 30, which is known as York Street east of Lincoln Square and Chambersburg Street west of Lincoln Square.

York Adams Transportation Authority (YATA) operates public transportation in Adams County. Freedom Transit, implemented in 2009, The hub of the bus system, the new Gettysburg Transit Center, is under construction on Carlisle Street. Beginning in 2011, a Rabbit Transit commuter bus to Harrisburg runs four times each weekday in each direction.

Media
 The Gettysburg Times, a daily newspaper
 Raices De Todos, a bilingual monthly cultural magazine, serves the city's growing Latino/Hispanic population
 The Evening Sun, a daily newspaper
 Celebrate Gettysburg, a lifestyle magazine
 WGET-AM 1320 and WGTY-FM 107.7, owned by the Times and News Publishing Company
 WZBT-FM 91.1, a non-commercial radio freeform format station owned by Gettysburg College
 The Adams County News was a newspaper located in Gettysburg, which was published 1908–17. (Available in digitized form online.)
 Gettysburg is located in the Harrisburg-Lancaster-Lebanon-York, PA media market. Television stations that cover Gettysburg news include WHTM-TV and WHP-TV in Harrisburg, WGAL in Lancaster, and WPMT in York. Some Gettysburg residents also receive broadcasts from WJZ-TV in Baltimore, Maryland and WDVM-TV in Hagerstown, Maryland.

Education
Gettysburg is served by the Gettysburg Area School District, Gettysburg College, Harrisburg Area Community College, and a campus of the United Lutheran Seminary.

Sister cities
Gettysburg's sister cities are:
 Gettysburg, South Dakota, since 1997
 León, Nicaragua, since 1987
 Sainte-Mère-Église, France, since 1993
 Morelia, Mexico, since 2004
 Sekigahara, Japan, since 2016

Notable buildings
 Eisenhower National Historic Site: Preserves the home and farm of Dwight D. Eisenhower, the 34th President of the United States, and its surrounding property of 
 Federal Building: Has served as the main Adams County Library since 1992 and was the 1912-1962 War Department/National Park Service headquarters of the Gettysburg National Military Park

Notable people
 
Laura A. Brown (1874–1924), American activist and local politician
Brian Patrick Clarke, American film and television actor born in 1952.
Steve Courson, former NFL player, played football at and graduated from Gettysburg Area High School in 1973. His #71 is the only number to be retired by GAHS.
Dwight D. Eisenhower, 34th U.S. president, and his wife Mamie Eisenhower, retired to a farm near Gettysburg after leaving the White House in 1961. He lived there until his death in 1969.
Julia Jacobs Harpster (1846–1935), American Lutheran missionary in India, born in Gettysburg.
The Rev. Henry Eyster Jacobs (1844–1932), theologian and Lutheran seminary president.
Julia H. Johnston, Christian songwriter who composed Grace Greater Than All Our Sin. 
Fritz Pfeiffer (1889–1960), artist.
Eddie Plank, member of the Baseball Hall of Fame, was born in Gettysburg in 1875 and played baseball at Gettysburg College.
The Rev. Samuel Simon Schmucker, a founder of Gettysburg College, and Lutheran Theological Seminary at Gettysburg.
Thaddeus Stevens, Gettysburg Attorney and leader of the Radical Republicans as an opponent to slavery. 
John Studebaker, co-founder of what would become the Studebaker Corporation automobile company, was born in Gettysburg in 1833.
Elizabeth Thorn (1832–1907), Evergreen Cemetery caretaker who buried approximately 100 fallen soldiers after the Battle of Gettysburg.

References

External links

Borough of Gettysburg official website
Gettysburg Convention & Visitors Bureau

 
County seats in Pennsylvania
Boroughs in Adams County, Pennsylvania
Populated places established in 1786
Battle of Gettysburg
Gettysburg National Military Park
1806 establishments in Pennsylvania